A buyout clause or release clause refers to a clause in a contract that imposes an obligation on another organisation wishing to acquire the services of the employee under contract to pay the (usually substantial) fee of the clause to the organisation which issued the contract and currently employs the employee.

It is most commonly used in reference to sports teams, where a transfer fee is usually paid for a player under contract; however, the current owning club is not obliged to sell their player, and if an agreement on a suitable fee cannot be reached, the buying club can instead resort to paying the player's buyout fee – should their contract have such a clause – which the owning club cannot block. Buyout clauses are usually set at a higher amount than the player's expected market value. However, on occasion, a player at a smaller club will sign a contract but insist on a low buyout fee to attract bigger clubs if their performances generate interest, which de facto functions as a reservation price set for the selling club.

The aim of this clause is twofold; firstly with its high amount, competing teams are discouraged from attempting to acquire the player if the current club shows no signs of selling them, and secondly it raises any hint to the players not to go through with their contractual commitment.

In Spain, buyout clauses have been mandatory in football contracts since 1985. If wishing to rescind their contract, the players are required to pay the buyout fee to their current club personally (via the league body), which would be advanced to them by the club signing them; however this advance of funds was originally deemed by the Spanish government to be taxable income, requiring the buying club to pay income tax on top of the fee itself, with the prohibitively high costs involved in this dual transaction discouraging clubs from making such deals. In October 2016 the laws were changed, with the buyout fee advances to the players no longer subject to tax, meaning only the fee itself had to be paid.

As of January 2022, the six largest buyout clauses were those of association football players Karim Benzema and Federico Valverde of Real Madrid, Pedri González, Ansu Fati and Ferran Torres of FC Barcelona (all €1 billion) and David Alaba (also Real Madrid, €850 million).

On 3 August 2017, Paris Saint-Germain activated the buyout clause of Brazilian footballer Neymar from FC Barcelona, which was set at €222 million, making him the most expensive football player in history, ahead of the previous record set by Paul Pogba (€105 million) in 2016, when he returned to English club Manchester United from Juventus.

References 

Contract law
Sports terminology
Association football terminology